Keith Anthony Tinsley (born March 31, 1965) is a former professional American football wide receiver in the National Football League. He attended Pittsburgh and played with the Cleveland Browns in 1987.

External links
Pro-Football Reference

1965 births
Living people
Players of American football from Detroit
Cleveland Browns players
Pittsburgh Panthers football players
American football wide receivers